Mikołaj Grzelak (born 20 June 1991) is a Polish professional footballer who plays as a defender for GKS Bełchatów.

Career
Grzelak made his Ekstraklasa debut in a 0–2 away loss against Górnik Zabrze on 2 November 2012, playing 9 minutes.

He suffered a serious injury in a I liga match against Bruk-Bet Termalica Nieciecza on 12 July 2020.

Grzelak returned to playing after 236 days of absence in a league fixture against Miedź Legnica on 5 March 2021.

On 7 September 2022, he rejoined GKS Bełchatów, now in fifth division, on a deal until the end of the season.

References

External links
 
 

1991 births
Living people
Polish footballers
Association football defenders
Ekstraklasa players
I liga players
II liga players
IV liga players
GKS Bełchatów players
Rozwój Katowice players
Legionovia Legionowo players
People from Bełchatów
Sportspeople from Łódź Voivodeship